The 2022 Herr's Snacks 200 was the 19th stock car race of the 2022 ARCA Menards Series season, and the 26th iteration of the event. The race was held on Saturday, October 1, 2022, in Salem, Indiana at Salem Speedway, a 0.555 mile (0.893 km) permanent oval shaped racetrack. The race took the scheduled 200 laps to complete. Sammy Smith, driving for Kyle Busch Motorsports, captured the win in a dominating fashion, leading every lap for his fifth career ARCA Menards Series win, and his fifth of the season. To fill out the podium, Jesse Love, driving for Venturini Motorsports, and Daniel Dye, driving for GMS Racing, would finish 2nd and 3rd, respectively.

Background 
The track has 33° degrees of banking in the corners. Major auto racing series that run at Salem are ARCA and USAC.

Entry list 

 (R) denotes rookie driver

 Tim Richmond was entered in the No. 06, but was replaced by Moeller after he crashed in qualifying.

Practice 
The only 45-minute practice session was held on Saturday, October 1, at 12:30 PM EST.

Qualifying 
Qualifying was held on Saturday, October 1, at 2:00 PM EST. The qualifying system used is a single-car, two-lap system with only one round. Whoever sets the fastest time in the round wins the pole.

Race results

Standings after the race 

Drivers' Championship standings

Note: Only the first 10 positions are included for the driver standings.

References

External links 

2022 ARCA Menards Series
Herr's Snacks 200
Herr's Snacks 200